Jonathan Kwesi Lamptey (born 10 May 1909, date of death unknown) was a Ghanaian politician. He was a senior figure in the CPP who later joined the opposition, subsequently playing leading roles in the government of the second republic.

Early life and education
He was born in Sekondi. He was educated locally, attending Mfantsipim School which he completed in 1931.  He then proceeded to Exeter University and the University of London.

Career
His career began as a science teacher at Fijai Secondary School, Sekondi. He got trained and practiced as a lawyer. He became deputy chairman of the CPP in 1950 and in 1951 he was elected into the legislative assembly of Sekondi and became junior minister of finance. Following the 1966 coup he was made Chairman of the State Gold Mining cooperation. In the Second Republic of Ghana he served as acting prime minister he also served as Minister for Defence from 1969 to 1971 and Minister for Parliamentary Affairs from 1971 to 1972 when the Busia government was overthrown by the SMC. Lamptey also served as the Leader of the House of parliament of Ghana in 1971. Following the 1972 coup he retired from active politics to continue his legal career in Sekondi.

Politics 
Lamptey was elected to represent the Sekondi constituency in the 1st parliament of the 2nd republic of Ghana.

1969 Elections 
He was elected on the ticket of the Progress Party. He was elected in the 1969 Ghanaian parliamentary elections.

See also
Busia government
List of MPs elected in the 1969 Ghanaian parliamentary election
List of MLAs elected in the 1951 Gold Coast legislative election

References

1909 births
Year of death missing
20th-century Ghanaian politicians
Mfantsipim School alumni
Alumni of the University of London
Alumni of the University of Exeter
People from Sekondi-Takoradi
Convention People's Party (Ghana) politicians
Ghanaian MPs 1951–1954
Ghanaian MPs 1969–1972